Dioicodendron is a monotypic genus of flowering plants in the family Rubiaceae. The genus contains only one species, viz. Dioicodendron dioicum, which is found from western South America to northwestern Venezuela.

Some authors recognize a second species, Dioicodendron cuatrecasasii.

References 

Monotypic Rubiaceae genera
Dialypetalantheae